Branka Jurca (24 May 1914 – 6 March 1999) was a Slovene writer, principally for children and young adults.

Jurca was born in Kopriva in the Karst region of what is now Slovenia in 1914. After the First World War the family moved to Maribor where she grew up. She worked as a teacher until the outbreak of the Second World War when she moved to Ljubljana. She participated in the Slovene Liberation Front but was arrested and sent to Gonars concentration camp and then Ravensbrück concentration camp. After the end of the war she worked as teacher for a while and then as an editor of the children's journal . She wrote 35 stories for children, novels and collections of short stories. She died in Ljubljana in 1999.

She was married to the writer and playwright Ivan Potrč and their daughter Marjetica Potrč is an architect.

Published works

 Adult Prose
  (Under the Whip (Images from Concentration Camps), 1945
  (... Then Life Won), 1953 
  (The Glass Castle), 1958

 For Children and Young Adults
, 1955 
, 1956 
, 1958 
, 1960 

, 1962 
, 1962 
, 1963 
, 1965 
, 1965 
, 1966 
, 1967 
, 1967 
, 1969 
, 1970 
, 1972 
, 1972 
, 1974 
, 1974
, 1976 
, 1977 
, 1977 
, 1977 
, 1978
, 1978 
, 1980 
, 1980 
, 1980 
, 1981
, 1983 
, 1983 
, 1984 
, 1985 
, 1986 
, 1986 
, 1987 
, 1990 
, 1993 
, 1994

References

Slovenian writers
Slovenian children's writers
Slovenian women writers
Slovenian women children's writers
1914 births
1999 deaths
Ravensbrück concentration camp survivors
Levstik Award laureates
People from the Municipality of Sežana
Yugoslav writers